Alexander Samuel MacLeod (1888–1956) was a painter and printmaker. He was born on Prince Edward Island, Canada on April 12, 1888.

Biography 
MacLeod studied at McGill University. After moving to San Francisco, he continued his artistic training at the California School of Design under Frank Van Sloun. In 1921, MacLeod arrived in Hawaii, where he worked in the art departments of the magazine Paradise of the Pacific and the local papers, The Honolulu Advertiser and the Honolulu Star-Bulletin.  By 1929, he had returned to Canada and resided there for ten years. Again in Hawaii, MacLeod became the director of the graphic art department for the United States Army in the Pacific. In 1943, he published a book of his Hawaiian prints, The Spirit of Hawaii, Before and After Pearl Harbor. MacLeod retired to Palo Alto, California, where he died in 1956.

MacLeod is best known for his Hawaiian landscapes (such as Fishpond, Kahaluu) and sympathetic representations of rural Hawaii's native population (such as Surfing Waikiki).  The California State Library (Sacramento), the Fine Arts Museums of San Francisco, the Honolulu Museum of Art, the Iris & B. Gerald Cantor Center for Visual Arts (Stanford University), the Nelson-Atkins Museum of Art (Kansas City, Missouri), the New York Public Library, the Seattle Art Museum, the Smithsonian American Art Museum (Washington, DC), and the University of Hawaii at Manoa are among the public collections holding works by Alexander Samuel MacLeod.

References
 Blackburn, Mark, Hawaiiana, Schiffer Publishing, Atglen, PA, 1996, pp. 21, 231
 Forbes, David W., Encounters with Paradise: Views of Hawaii and its People, 1778-1941, Honolulu Academy of Arts, 1992, 210–250.
 Hughes, Edan, Artists in California 1786-1940, Sacramento, Crocker Art Museum, 2002.
 MacLeod, Alexander Samuel, The Spirit of Hawaii, Before and After Pearl Harbor, New York, London, Harper & Brothers, 1943.
 Morse, Morse (ed.), Honolulu Printmakers, Honolulu, HI, Honolulu Academy of Arts, 2003, pp. 16 & 37, 
 Papanikolas, Theresa and DeSoto Brown, Art Deco Hawai'i, Honolulu, Honolulu Museum of Art, 2014, p. 77
 Sandulli, Justin M., Troubled Paradise: Madge Tennent at a Hawaiian Crossroads, Durham, NC: Duke University, 2016

Footnotes

20th-century American painters
American male painters
20th-century Canadian painters
Canadian male painters
Canadian printmakers
Artists from Prince Edward Island
1888 births
1956 deaths
Printmakers from Hawaii
San Francisco Art Institute alumni
20th-century American printmakers
20th-century American male artists
20th-century Canadian male artists